The 2015 Atlantic 10 Men's Soccer Tournament, known as the 2015 Atlantic 10 Men's Soccer Tournament Presented by Amtrak for sponsorship reasons, was the nineteenth edition of the tournament. It determined the Atlantic 10 Conference's automatic berth into the 2015 NCAA Division I Men's Soccer Championship. Fordham entered the tournament as the defending champions.

The Dayton Flyers won the Atlantic 10 title, besting the VCU Rams, 4–1 in the championship match. It was Dayton's first A-10 title since 2008. VCU previously made the A-10 final in 2012, where they lost to Saint Louis, also by a three-goal scoreline.

The tournament was hosted by George Mason University and all matches were contested at George Mason Stadium.

Qualification 

The top eight teams in the Atlantic 10 Conference based on their conference regular season records qualified for the tournament.

Bracket

Schedule

Quarterfinals

Semifinals

A-10 Championship

Statistical leaders

Top goalscorers

Tournament Best XI

See also 
 Atlantic 10 Conference
 2015 NCAA Division I men's soccer season
 2015 NCAA Division I Men's Soccer Championship

References 

Atlantic 10 Men's Soccer Tournament
Liberty Virginia